Jay Bocook is a professional composer and arranger, and also the Director of Athletic Bands at Furman University in Greenville, South Carolina. He was born in Clearwater, Florida in 1953 and received a Bachelor of Music degree from Furman University in 1975, and went on to receive a Master of Music degree from University of Louisiana at Monroe, (formerly Northeast Louisiana University).  He is an alumnus of Phi Mu Alpha Sinfonia, the national men's music fraternity. Bocook became a Sinfonian at Furman University, joining the Gamma Eta chapter of Phi Mu Alpha Sinfonia in 1972. He was also inducted into the Theta Lambda chapter of Sigma Alpha Iota as a National Arts Associate in 2006.

Mr. Bocook began his composing and arranging career in graduate school, and began to write for Jenson publications while serving as the band director at a small but well-known high school in Travelers Rest, South Carolina, leading them to become the South Carolina AAA state marching band champions in 1978. Mr. Bocook also arranged the well-known piece known as “Away” for the drum and bugle corps Blue Knights. He served as the Director of Bands at Furman University from 1982 until 1989, where he continued his rise to fame as an arranger. His arrangements were featured at the 1984, 1988, 1996, and 2002 Olympic Games. He writes for a wide range of ensembles, from elementary bands to the United States Marine Band. He was recently inducted in the American Bandmasters Association (ABA), and in 2009, was inducted into the Drum Corps International (DCI) Hall of Fame. He is also a member of the (SCBDA) South Carolina Band Directors Association Hall of Fame.

In addition to serving as Furman's Director of Athletic Bands, Mr. Bocook works as a staff composer/arranger for Hal Leonard. He currently serves as the chief arranger for the ten-time DCI World Champion, the Cadets Drum and Bugle Corps and has served in a similar role with perennial DCI Finalists, the Blue Knights Drum and Bugle Corps, from Denver, Colorado. Other groups include the fifteen-time DCA World Champion, the Reading Buccaneers Drum and Bugle Corps. He also composes music exclusively for a select group of high schools, namely the Avon High School Marching Band of Avon, IN, three time Grand National Champions and 9 time ISSMA State Champions.

References

External links
Drum Corps International Hall of Fame Induction
Furman University Staff Page

Living people
American male composers
21st-century American composers
Furman University alumni
1953 births
People from Clearwater, Florida
21st-century American male musicians